Vladimir Mikhailovich Myasishchev (September 28, 1902 in Yefremov – October 14, 1978 in Moscow) was a Soviet aircraft designer, Major General of Engineering (1944), Hero of Socialist Labor (1957), Doctor of Technical Sciences (1959), Honoured Scientist of the RSFSR (1972).

After his graduation from Moscow State Technical University in 1926, Myasishchev worked at the Tupolev Design Bureau and took part in constructing airplanes, such as Tupolev TB-1, Tupolev TB-3, and Tupolev ANT-20 Maxim Gorky. As an assistant to Boris Pavlovich Lisunov, he traveled to the United States in 1937 to help translate the Douglas DC-3 drawings in preparation for the production of the Lisunov Li-2.

In 1938, Myasishchev became a victim of a repression campaign. While in confinement, he worked at NKVD's Central Design Bureau No. 29 (ЦКБ-29 НКВД) in Moscow under the guidance of Vladimir Petlyakov, designing the Pe-2 bomber. In 1940, after his release, Myasishchev headed a design bureau (in the same building), working on the long-range high-altitude bomber DVB-102 (ДВБ-102). In 1946–1951, Myasishchev was the head of the faculty and later dean of the Department of Aircraft Design at Moscow Aviation Institute. In 1956, he became chief aircraft designer. In 1960–1967, Myasishchev was appointed Head of the Central Aerohydrodynamic Institute (TsAGI). In 1967–1978, Myasishchev held a post of the chief aircraft designer of the Experimental Machine Building Factory, which would bear his name starting 1981.

Myasishchev designed different kinds of military aircraft, including Pe-2B, Pe-2I, Pe-2M, DIS, DB-108, M-4, 3M, M-50. He also worked on a cargo aircraft VM-T Atlant and high-altitude airplane M-17 Stratosfera. Among Myasishchev's aeroplane designs, the 3M and M-4 set nineteen world records, and the M-17 "Stratosfera" twenty.

Myasishchev was awarded Hero of Socialist Labor gold star (in 1957), three Orders of Lenin (in 1945, 1957, 1962), the Order of Suvorov II degree (in 1944), the Order of the October Revolution (in 1971), medals.

See also 
 Myasishchev Design Bureau

External links 
 Encyclopædia Astronautix entry
 .
 A.I. Ostashev, Sergey Pavlovich Korolyov - The Genius of the 20th Century — 2010 M. of Public Educational Institution of Higher Professional Training MGUL .

References

Myasishchev, Vladimir Mikhailovich
Myasishchev, Vladimir Mikhailovich
Myasishchev, Vladimir Mikhailovich
Russian aerospace engineers
Myasishchev, Vladimir Mikhailovich
Myasishchev, Vladimir Mikhailovich
Bauman Moscow State Technical University alumni
Academic staff of Moscow Aviation Institute
Soviet inventors
Central Aerohydrodynamic Institute employees
Sharashka inmates